Arne Elsholtz (August 14, 1944 – April 26, 2016) was a German voice actor and dialogue director. He was one of the most well-known dubbing actors in Germany and he was also responsible for directing the German dubs of some international productions.

Biography
Elsholtz was born in Pritzwalk to actors Peter Elsholtz and Karin Vielmetter and he was the younger brother of actress Edith Elsholtz. Due to the connections his father had in the acting industry, Elsholtz began training as an actor with Marlise Ludwig in Berlin, where he would later act on stage. He eventually found a talent for dubbing and directing voices since 1964 and he quickly built up a reputation as one of the most powerful voice dubbers in Germany. Among the actors he dubbed included Tom Hanks, Bill Murray, Jeff Goldblum, Kevin Kline and Eric Idle.

Elsholtz dubbed Hanks in his award-winning performances, which includes Philadelphia and Forrest Gump. His other roles include Steve Guttenberg and Matt McCoy's roles in the Police Academy films. He also dubbed Joseph Marcell's role as Geoffrey Butler in The Fresh Prince of Bel Air (from which he also served as a dialogue director) and Sam Hui as King Kong in Aces Go Places. He dubbed many of Eric Idle's roles in many of the Monty Python films.

In Elsholtz's animated dub roles, he provided the German voice of Manny in the Ice Age films (excluding the fifth film, as he passed away before the German dub production was complete) and Hades in the 1997 Disney film Hercules and the subsequent television series as well as Lord Macintosh in Brave and Tom Hanks' characters in The Polar Express.

As a voice director, Elsholtz had directed the German voice dubs of many foreign films and television shows. These include The Godfather Saga, The Empire Strikes Back, Return of the Jedi, E.T. the Extra-Terrestrial and many more. His career was an actor was rare, but he had on-screen appearances on Escape from East Berlin. He also served as a commentator and announcer for commercials and radio shows such as Verona Pooth's Sat.1 variety show. From 2001 until 2003, he provided the German commentary for the Wer wird Millionär? video games.

Death
Elsholtz died in a Berlin hospital on April 26, 2016, at the age of 71. He was survived by his daughter, Sissi.

References

External links

1944 births
2016 deaths
People from Pritzwalk
German male voice actors
German male stage actors
German male radio actors
German male television actors
German male film actors
German voice directors
20th-century German male actors
21st-century German male actors